Ridha Jlassi (born 26 December 1979 in Nabeul, Tunisia) or Ridha the elephant, is a Tunisian football supporter and he is the official Tunisia national football team supporter. Ridha's first appearance was at the 2006 FIFA World Cup. He was chosen as the best 2018 FIFA World Cup fan.

References 

Association football culture
Association football supporters
1979 births
Living people